Para volver a amar (English title: Marriage Diaries) is a Mexican telenovela produced by Giselle González and Roberto Gómez Fernández for Televisa. It is a remake of the Colombian telenovela El Último Matrimonio Feliz. It premiered on Canal de las Estrellas on July 12, 2010. The series was originally scheduled to be broadcast at 10:00 p.m., but moved to 5:00 p.m. to add a few more minutes to the episodes of Soy tu dueña. The final episode aired on January 30, 2011.

It stars Rebecca Jones, René Strickler, Nailea Norvind, Alejandro Camacho, Alejandra Barros, Juan Carlos Barreto, Zaide Silvia Gutiérrez, Jesús Ochoa, Sophie Alexander, Mark Tacher, África Zavala and Flavio Medina.

Para Volver a Amar aired in the United States on Univision from March 8, 2011 to October 28, 2011.

Plot
The story revolves around the lives of six women who are facing the reality of their life with their husbands;

Antonia Palacios (Rebecca Jones), a successful and respected woman, who is married to Patricio González (René Strickler) and together they have a daughter, Paola (Thelma Madrigal). Antonia works for Braulio Longoria's (Alejandro Camacho) company, but when Paola has an accident, Antonia decides to resign and spend more time with her family. When Paola recovers, Patricio encourages Antonia to start her own real estate company.

Valeria Andrade (Nailea Norvind) is a socialite and fashion icon. Unbeknownst to society, she is a victim of psychological abuse by her husband, the respected businessman Braulio Longoria. Valeria has always had the idea that she is just a rag doll that Braulio bought from her mother, a prostitute who believed that Braulio would give a better life to her daughter and help her out financially. Their son, Sebastián (Alfonso Dosal), is rebellious and ignorant to the problems of his parents. Valeria soon joins the team of Antonia.

Bárbara Mantilla (Alejandra Barros) is a woman who works in Antonia's real estate business. Behind the appearance of a happy woman, Bárbara hides an intense frustration caused by Jaime Espinosa (Juan Carlos Barreto), her jealous and alcoholic husband who is physically abusive. Along with the couple lives his mother, Doña Conchita Cabrera (Magda Guzmán), a manipulative woman who tries to ruin Bárbara's life and supports Jaime's actions. Antonia soon discovers these problems and tries to help Bárbara.

Rosaura Pereyra (Zaide Silvia Gutiérrez) is a secretary who is married to Rolando Salgar (Jesús Ochoa), a womanizing taxi driver. Rolando is having an affair with a younger woman, Mireya, and leaves Rosaura and their two children, César and Jennifer. Rosaura starts working in Antonia's real estate company and will do anything to get her husband back.

Maité Duarte (Sophie Alexander) is a former client of Antonia who comes to work in Antonia's real estate company after she is fired from the company where she worked before. Antonia realizes that Maité is an ambitious and neurotic woman who is determined to compete against her husband, Jorge Casso (Mark Tacher), for money. Maité begins a legal fight against him to get a divorce. Despite this, Antonia doesn't deny her the opportunity to work and tries to help her.

Yorley Quiroga (África Zavala) is a hard-working woman who is tired of David Magaña (Flavio Medina), her slacker husband, who abandons his family in search of a better life in the United States. Meanwhile, Yorley falls in love with Leonardo Torres (Agustín Arana), but unfortunately for her, her daughter, Fanny, and David disagree with the relationship and try to break it up.

Renato Villamar (Édgar Vivar) is the gay owner of a beauty salon. Charito (Marcia Coutiño), one of the hairdressers and Renato's best friend, is completely in love with handyman Alcides (Alex Sirvent). Alcides is gay but, fearing rejection, keeps his true sexual orientation a secret - which he eventually reveals to Renato and Bárbara. Alcides' best friend Quintín (Eduardo España), a chauvinistic man who spends his time criticising women for their 'lack of morals', falls for Charito.

Antonia is proud of the help she grants to the other women. Everything changes when she develops breast cancer that begins to slowly break down her marriage when she tries to hide it. But despite all of this, Antonia sets an example to follow and changes the lives of all women who have come to her and gradually learns that there is still hope to love again.

Cast

Main

 Rebecca Jones - Antonia Palacios de González
 Alejandro Camacho -  Braulio Longoria Sampeiro
 René Strickler - Patricio González
 Alejandra Barros - Bárbara Mantilla de Espinosa
 Jesús Ochoa - Rolando Salgar
 Nailea Norvind - Valeria Andrade de Longoria
 África Zavala - Yorley Quiroga
 Mark Tacher - Jorge Casso

Also main

 Zaide Silvia Gutiérrez - Rosaura Pereyra de Salgar
 Flavio Medina - David Magaña
 Juan Carlos Barreto - Jaime Espinosa Cabrera
 Sophie Alexander - Maite Duarte de Casso
 Agustín Arana - Leonardo Torres
 Alberto Estrella - Rodrigo Longoria
 Susana González - Doménica Mondragon
 Justo Martínez - Don Nazario

Recurring

 Eduardo España - Quintín
 Pablo Valentín - Marcial Zambrano
 Danny Perea - Jennifer "Jenny" Salgar Pereyra
 Alex Sirvent - Alcides
 Marcia Coutiño - Charito
 Juan Ríos - Faber Esparza
 Gabriela Zamora - Mireya Nieto
 Jana Raluy - Miranda Pinto
 Alfonso Dosal - Sebastián Longoria Andrade
 Loania Quinzaños - Fanny Magaña Quiroga
 Claudia Godínez - Jessica
 Thelma Madrigal - Paola "Pao" González Palacios
 Guillermo Avilán - César Salgar Pereyra
 Magda Guzmán - Doña Conchita Cabrera Vda. de Espinosa
 Édgar Vivar - Renato Villamar
 Ricardo Guerra - Pavel
 Cassandra Ciangherotti - Laila
 Arturo Barba - Román Pérez
 Ricardo Fastlitcht - Plinio
 Lisset - Denisse
 Adalberto Parra - Amador
 Ariane Pellicer - Cindy
 Georgina Pedret - Clarita
 Karol Sevilla - Monse Esparza
 Mario Loria - Sergio Aldama
 Emmanuel Orenday - Dylan
 Jonathan Becerra - Beto
 Alex Perea - El Zorro
 Juan Verduzco - Enrique Pimentel
 Miguel Pizarro - Andrés
 Socorro Bonilla - Ofelia
 Maricruz Nájera - Confesión

Awards and nominations

References

External links 

Mexican telenovelas
Televisa telenovelas
2010 telenovelas
2010 Mexican television series debuts
2011 Mexican television series endings
Mexican television series based on Colombian television series
Spanish-language telenovelas